William Lofgren (February 14, 1913 – June 11, 2004) was an American canoeist who competed in the 1936 Summer Olympics.

He was born in Brooklyn, New York and died in Phoenix, Arizona

In 1936 he and his partner William Gaehler finished seventh in the K-2 10000 metres competition.

References
Sports-reference.com profile

1913 births
2004 deaths
Sportspeople from Brooklyn
American male canoeists
Canoeists at the 1936 Summer Olympics
Olympic canoeists of the United States